Quince Orchard may refer to:

Quince Orchard, Maryland, an unincorporated area and neighborhood of Gaithersburg, Maryland
Quince Orchard Road, part of Maryland Route 124
Quince Orchard High School, a high school on Quince Orchard Road

See also
Quince